Leucobacter is a bacterial genus from the family Microbacteriaceae.

Species
Leucobacter comprises the following species:

 L. aerolatus Martin et al. 2010
 L. albus Lin et al. 2004
 L. alluvii Morais et al. 2006
 L. aridicollis Morais et al. 2005
 L. celer Shin et al. 2011
 L. chironomi Halpern et al. 2009
 L. chromiireducens Morais et al. 2005
 L. chromiiresistens Sturm et al. 2011
 L. chromiisoli Xu et al. 2021
 L. coleopterorum Hyun et al. 2022
 L. corticis Li et al. 2017
 L. denitrificans Weon et al. 2012
 "L. epilobiisoli" Hou et al. 2018
 L. exalbidus Ue 2011
 L. holotrichiae Zhu et al. 2016
 "L. humi" Her and Lee 2015
 L. iarius Somvanshi et al. 2007
 L. insecticola Hyun et al. 2022
 L. japonicus (Clark and Hodgkin 2015) Nouioui et al. 2018
 L. komagatae Takeuchi et al. 1996
 "L. kyeonggiensis" Kim and Lee 2011
 L. luti Morais et al. 2006
 "L. margaritiformis" Lee and Lee 2012
 "L. massiliensis" Leangapichart et al. 2018
 L. muris Benga et al. 2019
 L. musarum Clark and Hodgkin 2015
 L. populi Fang et al. 2016
 L. ruminantium Chun et al. 2017
 L. salsicius Yun et al. 2011
 L. soli Kämpfer et al. 2021

 "Ca. L. sulfonamidivorax" corrig. Reis et al. 2019
 L. tardus Behrendt et al. 2008
 L. triazinivorans Sun et al. 2018
 "L. tropicalis" Liu et al. 1999
 L. viscericola Hyun et al. 2022
 L. weissii Schumann and Pukall 2017
 L. zeae Lai et al. 2015

References

Further reading 
 
 
 
 
 

Microbacteriaceae
Bacteria genera